Zagorzyn may refer to the following places in Poland:
Zagorzyn, Greater Poland Voivodeship (west-central Poland)
Zagorzyn, Lesser Poland Voivodeship (south Poland)
Zagórzyn, West Pomeranian Voivodeship (north-west Poland)